Jörgen Windahl (born 12 March 1963) is a former professional tennis player from Sweden.

Career
Windahl was the Boys' Singles Champion at the 1981 Australian Open, the first Swede to win the junior title. He defeated Pat Cash in the final. In Wimbledon later that year, he played in both the Men's Doubles and Singles, but wasn't able to make it past the first round in either. He lost to Ángel Giménez in the singles and with his partner Robert Booth was defeated in five set by Scott McCain and Steve Meister in the doubles.

As a singles player he reached the quarter-finals at Metz in 1986 and was a semi-finalist in Madrid the following year. He again competed at Wimbledon in 1987 but lost in the opening round to American qualifier Ken Flach.

He was more successful on the doubles circuit, winning his first career title in the 1986 Geneva Open. The Swede was also a doubles finalist at Bologna in 1989 and doubles semi-finals at both Boston and Tel Aviv in 1986 and again in the 1989 Madrid Tennis Grand Prix.

Grand Prix career finals

Doubles: 2 (1–1)

Challenger titles

Singles: (2)

Doubles: (5)

References

1963 births
Living people
Swedish male tennis players
Australian Open (tennis) junior champions
People from Danderyd Municipality
Grand Slam (tennis) champions in boys' singles
Sportspeople from Stockholm County